André Pilette (6 October 1918 – 27 December 1993), son of former Indy 500 participant Théodore Pilette, was a racing driver from Belgium.  He participated in 14 Formula One World Championship Grands Prix, debuting on 17 June 1951.  He scored 2 championship points. His son Teddy Pilette also became a racing driver, although his F1 career in the mid-1970s was much briefer.

Complete Formula One World Championship results
(key)

''* Indicates Shared Drive with Élie Bayol

References

1918 births
1993 deaths
Belgian racing drivers
Belgian Formula One drivers
Ecurie Nationale Belge Formula One drivers
Gordini Formula One drivers
Ferrari Formula One drivers
Scirocco-Powell Formula One drivers
24 Hours of Le Mans drivers
World Sportscar Championship drivers
French emigrants to Belgium
24 Hours of Spa drivers